Aernout van Lennep (23 February 1898 – 17 December 1974) was a Dutch horse rider. He competed in eventing at the 1932 Summer Olympics and won a team silver medal, finishing ninth individually.

Van Lennep was a career artillery officer, and won the Dutch military championships in 1931. He was a prisoner of war in Germany during World War II, and later became a lieutenant colonel in the 1950s.

References

1898 births
1974 deaths
Dutch male equestrians
Event riders
Equestrians at the 1932 Summer Olympics
Olympic equestrians of the Netherlands
Olympic silver medalists for the Netherlands
People from Den Helder
Olympic medalists in equestrian
Royal Netherlands Army personnel of World War II
Dutch prisoners of war in World War II
World War II prisoners of war held by Germany
Medalists at the 1932 Summer Olympics
Sportspeople from North Holland